is a train station in Nakamura-ku, Nagoya, Aichi Prefecture, Japan.

Lines

 (Station number: H03)

Layout

Platforms

References

External links
 
 Mitsubishi Heavy Industries Iwatsuka Plant

Railway stations in Japan opened in 1982
Railway stations in Aichi Prefecture